Walking on a Rainbow is the debut album by group Blue System, released on 2 November 1987 by Hansa Records. Its only single is "Sorry Little Sarah", which peaked at no. 14 on the German charts.

Track listing
   "Gangster Love" (Maxi Version) – 4:24
   "Sorry Little Sarah" (Maxi Version) – 5:12
   "She's a Lady" (Maxi Version) – 4:59
   "Voodoo Nights"  – 3:23
   "Love Me More" (Maxi Version) – 4:57
   "Emanuelle" (Maxi Version) – 4:19
   "Big Boys Don't Cry" (Maxi Version) – 5:05
   "G.T.O."  – 3:28

Personnel
 Dieter Bohlen –  lead vocals, refrain vocals [track 1,6,7], producer, arranger, lyrics
 Rolf Köhler – refrain vocals, chorus
 Detlef Wiedeke – chorus
 Michael Scholz – chorus
 Luis Rodríguez – co-producer, engineering

External links

1987 debut albums
Blue System albums
Hansa Records albums